Ballistic impact is a high velocity impact by a small mass object, analogous to runway debris or small arms fire. The simulation of ballistic impacts can be achieved with a light-gas gun or other ballistic launcher. It is important to study the response of materials to ballistic impact loads. Applications of this research include body armor, armored vehicles and fortified buildings, as well as the protection of essential equipment, such as the jet engines of an airliner.

References

See also
Impact (mechanics)

Ballistics
Firearms
Forensic techniques
Materials testing
Projectiles